Radio Televizija Luna is a television and radio company in Montenegro. Its headquarters are in Plav. It provides TV Luna and Radio Luna.

Mass media in Montenegro